Zayatgyi is a village in Shwegu Township in Bhamo District in the Kachin State of north-eastern Myanmar. The village is based on rocky and mountainous basins.

References

External links
Satellite map at Maplandia.com

Populated places in Kachin State
Shwegu Township